Blackthorn (Aline Pagrovna) is a fictional character, a superhero appearing in American comic books published by Marvel Comics. The character is usually depicted as a member of the Strikeforce: Morituri. The character was created by Peter B. Gillis and Brent Anderson.

Publication history
Aline Pagrovna (Blackthorn) was created by writer Peter B. Gillis and artist Brent Anderson and debuted in Strikeforce: Morituri #1 (December 1986), a Marvel Comics series set in a dystopian future, where young people, intent on fighting an invading alien species, undergo a scientific process which grants them superhuman abilities, albeit significantly reducing their lifespan in the process. The codename "Blackthorn" was introduced in issue #2. Blackthorn remained in the regular cast of the book throughout Strikeforce: Morituri #1-15. She subsequently went missing, before reappearing in issues #19-20, which tied up her hanging story threads and ended with her inevitable death.

Blackthorn was the last member of the original roster to die and also has the distinction of appearing in more issues of the series than any other Morituri member, appearing in a total of 16 issues. Together with Adept, Blackthorn was the favorite character of series creator Peter B. Gillis, thus explaining her prominence and longevity, amidst the ever-shifting cast of the book. According to Gillis,  Blackthorn "had some of the best moments in the book. Which is partly why I killed her last — sort of a Hannibal Lecter thing to say, isn’t it?".

Fictional character biography
Aline L. Pagrovna was a self-described "wallflower", always shy and unnoticed by others and without ever having had a romantic relationship. The only reason she did not commit suicide was because she was confident nobody would notice. In 2073, faced with the prospect of a long, boring, eventless life, Pagrovna decided to volunteer for the Morituri program, a program which would grant her superhuman powers, effectively turning her into a living weapon of Earth in its ongoing war against the invading alien race collectively known as "the Horde". The process, however, essentially equals suicide, because the recipients of the process inevitably suffer the so-called "Morituri effect" within a year of undertaking the process, a 100% fatal rejection of the process by the human organism.

After meeting the specific biological criteria which ensure whether a person's organism can be compatible with the process, Pagrovna becomes the first member of the premier generation of Strikeforce: Morituri to undergo the process. Like all recipients of the process, Pagrovna initially acquires enhanced strength, a by-product of the first stage of the Morituri process, which strengthens the organism of its recipients, in preparation for the later stages. Later, one night, while under great stress, Pagrovna manifests her superhuman power, the ability to disrupt molecular bonds in all substances. Subsequently, she gives herself the anonym "Blackthorn".

Blackthorn participates in various missions with the team, which quickly becomes hailed as humanity's saviors. After the team gives its first press conference, Blackthorn and her teammates attend a party in New York, where they meet the actors that will portray them in an upcoming video series. Blackthorn meets Guy Harding, a famous actor who portrays her teammate, Radian, in the series, and begins flirting with him. Blackthorn then begins a string of numerous casual relationships, making up for the fact she never had a boyfriend before. After they meet again later in a party in Holowood (21st-century Hollywood), Blackthorn and Guy begin a romantic relationship, despite Blackthorn's concerns that he becomes involved with her for publicity reasons.

Pregnancy and death
Later, while the team raids a Horde mothership in orbit around Jupiter, one of the team members, Adept, embraces Blackthorn and, through her analytic abilities, realizes she is pregnant. Blackthorn is shocked, since she realizes she does not have enough time left to bring the baby to term. Upon returning to Earth, the team confronts the newer generation of Morituri, who have been assigned by their employers, the Paedia Council, to detain the veteran members, who are now perceived as "renegades", after violating regulations. During the battle, one of the new members, Wildcard, feels his death approaching due to the Morituri effect. In his panic, he reaches out to Blackthorn, copying her powers, as his own Morituri abilities detected something keeping her Morituri Effect in check, not realizing that this unknown factor was her pregnancy. As Wildcard's body melts, Blackthorn is horrified, knowing how her death from the Morituri effect will occur. The team is later acquitted of all charges.

After Radian, the last other surviving Morituri of her generation dies, Blackthorn flees from the Morituri base, keeping her pregnancy a secret from her superiors. Blackthorn moves with Guy in a mansion in Carmel, California, leading a peaceful life. The couple considers asking the help of the Paedia government in putting their unborn daughter in an incubator in order to save her life, since Blackthorn can die from the inescapable Morituri effect at any given minute. However, they also fear that the Paedia, which has visibly exploited the lives of the Morituri on occasion, will take their newborn daughter away from Guy to perform genetic tests on her, a prospect that both Guy and Blackthorn resent.

Eventually, Dr. Kimmo Tuolema, the inventor of the Morituri process and a trustworthy supporter of the Morituri, secretly visits Guy and Blackthorn and manages to extract the baby from the pregnant Aline, putting it in an incubator. Tuolema explains that Blackthorn has outlived the one-year limit of the Morituri process - approximately thirteen months have passed since she underwent the process - thanks to her pregnancy. Tuolema explains that the Morituri effect is actually the catastrophic rejection of the foreign high-energy metabolism, inserted through the Morituri process, by the host's organism, leaving it without metabolism and thus killing it. However, because of the baby she carried, Blackthorn had a second metabolism, that of the baby, which somehow protected her and prolonged her life.

Shortly afterwards, Aline succumbs to the Morituri effect and melts in the arms of Guy. Guy is later seen raising their newborn daughter, whom he has named "Aline", in her honor.

Powers and abilities
Blackthorn had the ability to disrupt the molecular bonds of virtually every substance, living or inanimate, causing it to break or melt. She only faced difficulty when confronted with extremely thick materials. Like all Morituri recipients, Blackthorn also had enhanced strength, as a result of her exposure to the Morituri process. Like her teammates, she wore specially designed boots which enabled her to fly.

References

Comics characters introduced in 1986
Marvel Comics characters with superhuman strength
Marvel Comics female superheroes
Marvel Comics mutates
Marvel Comics superheroes
Strikeforce: Morituri